Thathom is a district of Xaisomboun province, Laos.

References 

Districts of Laos